Dmitri Osipov may refer to:

 Dmitri Osipov (footballer), born 1996
 Dmitri Osipov (ice hockey, born 1979)